The 2014 Southeastern Louisiana Lions football team represented Southeastern Louisiana University in the 2014 NCAA Division I FCS football season. The Lions were led by third-year head coach Ron Roberts and played their home games at Strawberry Stadium. They are a member of the Southland Conference. They finished the season 9–4 overall, 7–1 in conference play to finish in a share for the Southland title. They received an at-large bid to the FCS Playoffs where they lost in the first round to fellow Southland Conference champion Sam Houston State 21–17.

Schedule

Game summaries

Jacksonville

In their first game of the season, the Lions won, 44–3 over the Jacksonville Dolphins.

Southern Utah

In their second game of the season, the Lions won, 41–14 over the Southern Utah Thunderbirds.

@ Tulane

In their third game of the season, the Lions lost, 35–20 to the Tulane Green Wave.

@ Southeast Missouri State

In their fourth game of the season, the Lions lost, 24–23 to the Southeast Missouri State Redhawks.

@ Incarnate Word

In their fifth game of the season, the Lions won, 63–7 over the Incarnate Word Cardinals.

Northwestern State

In their sixth game of the season, the Lions won, 30–22 over the Northwestern State Demons.

@ Lamar

In their seventh game of the season, the Lions won, 61–34 over the Lamar Cardinals.

Central Arkansas

In their eighth game of the season, the Lions won, 41–24 over the Central Arkansas Bears.

@ Stephen F. Austin

In their ninth game of the season, the Lions lost, 27–17 to the Stephen F. Austin Lumberjacks.

Houston Baptist

In their tenth game of the season, the Lions won, 76–7 over the Houston Baptist Huskies.

McNeese State

In their eleventh game of the season, the Lions won, 28–9 over the McNeese State Cowboys.

@ Nicholls State

In their twelfth game of the season, the Lions won, 62–3 over the Nicholls State Colonels.

@ Sam Houston State

In their thirteenth game of the season, the Lions lost, 21–17 to the Sam Houston State Bearkats in their 2014 FCS First Round playoff game.

Ranking movements

References

Southeastern Louisiana
Southeastern Louisiana Lions football seasons
Southland Conference football champion seasons
Southeastern Louisiana
Southeastern Louisiana Lions football